Mythology is an album by new age artist Eloy Fritsch.

AllMusic's Cesar Lanzarini described the record as "a landmark in Fritsch's career".

Track listing
 "The Creation" – 2:59
 "Inti" – 3:07
 "Assur" – 3:45
 "Curupira" – 4:04
 "Aphrodite" – 2:57
 "Shiva" – 3:01
 "Isis" – 3:15
 "Asgard" – 2:45
 "Atlantis" – 5:55
 "Excalibur" – 6:08
 "Jupiter" – 4:00
 "Kinich-Ahau" – 6:07
 "Yang & Yin" – 3:29
 "Quetzalcoatl" – 6:05
 "Mermaids" – 4:35

References

2001 albums
Eloy Fritsch albums